Rider is a publishing imprint of Ebury Publishing, a Penguin Random House division. The list was started by William Rider & Son in Britain in 1908 when he took over the occult publisher Phillip Wellby. The editorial director of the new list was Ralph Shirley and under his direction, they began to publish titles as varied as the Rider–Waite tarot deck and Bram Stoker's Dracula.

Today the Rider motto is "New Ideas for New Ways of Living" and books and authors on the list reflects this. There are still books on the paranormal, with authors like Raymond Moody and Colin Fry; on astral projection with authors Sylvan Muldoon and Hereward Carrington; and spirituality, with books by the Dalai Lama and Jack Kornfield; but there are also books on current and international affairs by authors as diverse as Nobel Prize-winners Archbishop Desmond Tutu and Shirin Ebadi.

External links
 Official Rider website

Bibliography

 Vera Stanley Alder, The Finding of the Third Eye, 1938
 Vera Stanley Alder, The Initiation of the World, 1939
 Vera Stanley Alder, The Fifth Dimension, 1940
 Vera Stanley Alder, Wisdom in Practice, 1942
 Vera Stanley Alder, The Secret of the Atomic Age, 1958
 Vera Stanley Alder, From the Mundane to the Magnificent, 1979
 Paul Brunton,  A Search in Secret India, 1934
 Paul Brunton, The Secret Path, 1935
 Paul Brunton, A Search in Secret Egypt, 1936
 Paul Brunton, A Message from Arunachala, 1936
 Paul Brunton, A Hermit in the Himalayas, 1936
 Paul Brunton, The Quest of the Overself, 1937
 Paul Brunton, Wisdom of the Overself, 1943
 Gerald Gardner, Witchcraft Today, 1954
 J. G. Carew Gibson, Communication with the Dead, 1930
 Tony Hogan, Born to Heal, 2002
 Karlfried Graf Dürckheim, The Japanese Cult of Tranquility, 1960
 Arthur Osborne, The Incredible Sai Baba, 1957
 Jonathan Yardley, States of Mind: A Personal Journey Through the Mid-Atlantic, 1993, 
 Ben Okri, Tales of Freedom, 2010, ISBN  978-1846041594

References 

Random House
Book publishing companies of the United Kingdom
Publishing companies established in 1908
1908 establishments in England
British companies established in 1908